Rose Hill is a 1997 American Western television film, directed by Christopher Cain and written by Earl W. Wallace. The film stars Jennifer Garner, Jeffrey D. Sams, Vera Farmiga, Justin Chambers, and Zak Orth. It is based on Julie Garwood's 1995 novel For the Roses. The film premiered on CBS on April 20, 1997.

Plot
Four Boston street urchins adopt a young infant that they discovered in a wagon when they made their escape from the police. They named the baby girl Mary Rose. As they grow up together, the five eventually settle in Blue Belle, Montana. In Blue Belle, Mary Rose and her four brothers (Adam, Cole, Douglas, and Travis) have a free-range cattle farm by the name of Rose Hill near a lake. There, Mary Rose grows up and longs to find her real family, as well as learn about her true identity.

Cast
 Jennifer Garner as Mary Rose Clayborne
 Courtney Chase as Young Mary Rose
 Jeffrey D. Sams as Adam Clayborne
 Michael Alexander Jackson as Young Adam
 Justin Chambers as Cole Clayborne
 Kevin Zegers Young Cole
 Zak Orth as Douglas Clayborne
 David Klein as Young Douglas
 Tristan Tait as Travis Clayborne
 Blair Slater as Young Travis
 Vera Farmiga as Emily Elliot
 David Aaron Baker as Harrison Elliot
 Stuart Wilson as Richard Elliot

Production
The film was directed by Christopher Cain and was written by Earl W. Wallace who adapted the screenplay from the Claybornes of Rose Hill novels, which were written by author Julie Garwood. This film is based on the first novel in Garwood's series, For the Roses. It premiered on CBS on April 20, 1997 in the United States, as was distributed by Hallmark Home Entertainment. Principal photography took place in Calgary, Alberta, Longview, Alberta and Montreal, Quebec in Canada.

Accolades

Differences from novels

 Adam marries
 Cole is killed
 Douglas and Travis leave the ranch in search of their independent fortunes
 There is no correspondence between the siblings and Mary Rose
 Harrison is Mary Rose's brother
 Mary Rose's father lives in New York

References

External links
 
 Hallmark Channel microsite

1997 television films
1997 films
American television films
Western (genre) television films
1990s English-language films
Films directed by Christopher Cain
Films scored by Steve Dorff
Hallmark Hall of Fame episodes